Anthony Joseph Miller (1941–22 December 1960) became the second-last criminal to be executed in Scotland when he was hanged on the gallows at Glasgow's Barlinnie Prison on 22 December 1960. Miller had been convicted of murdering John Cremin at Queen's Park Recreation Ground (near Hampden Park) in Glasgow on 6 April 1960. At 19 years of age, Miller was the last teenager to be executed in the United Kingdom.

At the time of his arrest, he was an apprentice cabinet-maker who lived with his family in Dixon Road in Crosshill, in the South Side of Glasgow. Miller's accomplice James Denovan and his family lived in Calder Street in nearby Govanhill.

The murder
The murder of John Cremin was a robbery that went wrong. Miller and Denovan were in the habit of working together as a team, robbing homosexual men who would not report the crimes as homosexuality was illegal at the time. They would use Denovan (a 16-year-old boy) as bait to attract victims. After Denovan had lured the victims to a secluded area of the park out of public view, Miller would suddenly appear, threatening the victims with violence unless they handed over all their valuables. During this particular robbery Cremin was beaten to death and his body hidden under bushes, where it was later discovered by a man out walking his dog.

Denovan was arrested on 11 August 1960 while committing an act of indecency with another man on the Recreation Ground. A newspaper cutting relating to the death of John Cremin was found on his person; Denovan would finally confess his guilt and lead the police to Miller.

The trial
Miller and Denovan's trial began in Glasgow High Court on 14 November 1960. They were charged with the capital murder of John Cremin as well as three other charges of assault and robbery. Miller also faced another charge of assault and robbery committed with two other accomplices, while Denovan was also charged with committing an act of indecency. At the end of a three-day trial, Miller was found guilty of capital murder, while Denovan was found guilty of non-capital murder. Both verdicts were unanimous.

As a 19-year-old Miller was legally an adult, and because the murder had taken place during the course of a robbery (Cremin had been robbed of his watch, bankbook and £67), this made him eligible for the death penalty under the terms of the Homicide Act 1957. Accordingly, he was sentenced to death by Lord Wheatley, the trial judge. However, as a 16-year-old, Denovan was considered a child in the judicial system and therefore too young to face the death penalty. Consequently, he was sentenced to be detained at Her Majesty's Pleasure.

Execution
The appeals of both Miller and Denovan were dismissed by the Scottish Court of Criminal Appeal in Edinburgh on 7 December 1960 (the date which had originally been set for Miller's execution). A new execution date of 22 December was decided. Miller's family organised a petition to the Secretary of State for Scotland, John Maclay, asking him to recommend a reprieve, with a stall in Glasgow city centre. The petition received 30,000 signatures, but it was turned down.

Miller was hanged at 8.02 a.m. on 22 December by official executioner Harry Allen, assisted by Robert Leslie Stewart. It was the last execution to take place at HMP Barlinnie.

A theatre play about Miller's last days in the condemned cell, Please, Mister (the title comes from Miller's alleged last words on the scaffold), was written by Patrick Harkins and first performed in 2010. The initial production starred Iain De Caestecker (in the role of Miller) and David Hayman.

The last ever judicial execution in Scotland was that of Henry John Burnett, which took place in Aberdeen on 15 August 1963.

References

Skelton, Douglas Glasgow's Black Heart: A City's Life of Crime

MacKay,  Donald    "Scotlands Hanged 1946 to 1963"  (2016)

External links
 Daily Record article from December 2010.
 Glasgow Herald article from June 1995.
 Daily Record article which mentions the case briefly.
 'Hanging With Frank' (video showing UK execution protocol at the old gallows in Barlinnie Prison)
 BBC Alba documentary clip

1941 births
1960 deaths
1960 in Scotland
People executed by Scotland by hanging
20th-century executions by Scotland
Executed Scottish people
Place of birth missing
Scottish people convicted of murder
People convicted of murder by Scotland
20th-century Scottish criminals
1960 murders in the United Kingdom
People executed for murder
People from Govanhill and Crosshill